Patrick Andreas Thuresson (born November 18, 1987) is a Swedish professional ice hockey player currently playing with Kölner Haie of the Deutsche Eishockey Liga (DEL).

Playing career
Thuresson was drafted by the Nashville Predators in the fifth round of the 2007 NHL Entry Draft, 144th overall. Andreas scored his first NHL goal on December 31, 2009 against Mathieu Garon of the Columbus Blue Jackets.

On July 2, 2011, he was traded to the New York Rangers for Brodie Dupont. Thuresson was assigned to the Rangers AHL affiliate, the Connecticut Whale, for the duration of the 2011–12 season. After scoring only 21 points in 73 games at season's end, Thuresson returned to his native Sweden signing a one-year contract with Brynäs IF of the Elitserien on May 18, 2012.

In a second stint with the Redhaws, Thuresson played two seasons with the club before leaving as a free agent to sign a one-year deal with Chinese club, Kunlun Red Star of the Kontinental Hockey League (KHL) on June 5, 2017.

After returning to Sweden for the 2018–19 season with HV71, Thuresson again opted to move abroad at the conclusion of his contract in signing a new two-year deal with German club, Schwenninger Wild Wings of the DEL on April 22, 2019.

Thuresson played with the Wild Wings for two seasons before moving to fellow DEL club, Kölner Haie, on a one-year contract on 12 May 2021.

Personal
Thuresson was married to Morgan Jaye Zabrowski on March 21, 2015.

Career statistics

Regular season and playoffs

International

References

External links

1987 births
Living people
Brynäs IF players
Connecticut Whale (AHL) players
HV71 players
Kölner Haie players
HC Kunlun Red Star players
Malmö Redhawks players
Milwaukee Admirals players
Nashville Predators draft picks
Nashville Predators players
People from Kristianstad Municipality
Schwenninger Wild Wings players
SCL Tigers players
Severstal Cherepovets players
HC Sibir Novosibirsk players
Swedish ice hockey centres
Sportspeople from Skåne County